Winter grape is a common name which may refer to any of the following species of grapevine:

Vitis cinerea (also called graybark grape)
Vitis vulpina (also called "frost grape")